The 2022 Sazka Tour was a road cycling stage race that took place between 4 and 7 August 2022 in Czech Republic. The race was rated as a category 2.1 event on the 2022 UCI Europe Tour calendar, and was the 13th edition of the Sazka Tour.

Teams 
Three of the 18 UCI WorldTeams, six UCI ProTeams, and thirteen UCI Continental teams made up the 22 teams that participated in the race.

UCI WorldTeams

 
 
 

UCI ProTeams

 
 
 
 
 
 

UCI Continental Teams

Route

Stages

Stage 1 
4 August 2022 – Uničov to Prostějov,

Stage 2 
5 August 2022 – Olomouc to Pustevny,

Stage 3 

Stage 4 
7 August 2022 – Šumperk to Šternberk,

Classification leadership table

Final classification standings

General classification

Points classification

Mountains classification

Young rider classification

Teams classification

References

External links 
 

Sazka Tour
Sazka Tour